Route 96 is a state highway that travels from Route 171 near Carl Junction, in Jasper County, to Interstate 44 (I-44) in Halltown, in Lawrence County. A large section of the highway between Carthage and Halltown served as part of U.S. Route 66 (US 66) and is currently marked as Historic Route 66.

The road was numbered due to its being an extension of K-96 and its eastern terminus was in Carthage. When US 66 was deleted east of Joplin, Route 96 was extended to replace US 66.

Route 96 was redesignated as Route YY west of Route 171 when Kansas deleted the eastern part of K-96.

Route description

Route 96 begins at a partial interchange with Interstate 44 (I-44) just west of Halltown (there is no access to westbound I-44 or from eastbound I-44). The highway is a two-lane road and is relatively straight all the way to Carthage. Approximately  further west, Route 96 is joined by Historic Route 66.

At Albatross, is an intersection with Route 39. Approximately  further west is an intersection with Route 97. At Avilla, there is a  concurrency with Route 37. As the road approaches Carthage, the highway curves south, then curves west again to become Central Street. At Garrison Avenue, the highway begins a concurrency with Route 571 and the road becomes a wide boulevard.

 west of Garrison Avenue is an interchange with I-49/US 71. At this point, Route 571 ends and Route 171 and Business I-49, both of which join Route 96 and the road is a freeway. The first exit west of I-49/US 71, Route 96 turns off and becomes a two-lane road again. North of Joplin, Route 96 intersects Route 43. Approximately  further west, Route 96 ends at Route 171.

History

Originally, Route 96 continued across Route 171 and turned south, curving around the west side of Carl Junction. The road then traveled  further west and crossed the Kansas state line.

Major intersections

See also

References

External links

096
096
Transportation in Jasper County, Missouri
Transportation in Lawrence County, Missouri